The 2015–16 Basketball Bundesliga was the 50th season of the Basketball Bundesliga. The regular season started on October 2, 2015, and the season ended with the last game of the Finals on June 12.

Brose Baskets defended their title.

Team information
The ProA champions Gießen 46ers promoted to the BBL, along with runners-up s.Oliver Baskets. Crailsheim Merlins received a wild card from the league, to fill up the spot of Artland Dragons.

Stadia and locations

Personnel and kits

Regular season

Standings

Results

Playoffs

Awards

All-Star Game
The 2016 All-Star Game was played at the Brose Arena in Bamberg. Per Günther was named the BBL All-Star Game MVP.

INJ Niels Giffey didn't play because of an injury.
REP Brad Loesing was named as Giffey's replacement.

Statistics

Season highs

Source: RealGM

References

External links
German League official website  

Basketball Bundesliga seasons
German
1